A super heavy-lift launch vehicle can lift a super heavy payload to low Earth orbit. It is the most capable launch vehicle classification by mass to orbit, exceeding that of the heavy-lift launch vehicle classification. Only thirteen such payloads were successfully launched prior to 2022: twelve as part of the Apollo program before 1972 and one Energia launch in 1987. Planned crewed lunar and interplanetary missions often depend on these launch vehicles' payload capacity.

Many early super heavy-lift launch vehicle concepts were produced in the 1960s, including the Sea Dragon. During the Space Race, the Saturn V and N1 were built by the United States and Soviet Union, respectively. After the Saturn V's successful Apollo program and the N1's failures, the Soviets' Energia launched twice in the 1980s, once with the Buran spaceplane. The next two decades saw multiple concepts drawn out once again, most notably Shuttle-derived vehicles and Rus-M, but none would be built. In the 2010s, super heavy-lift launch vehicles received interest once again, leading to the launch of the Falcon Heavy and the Space Launch System, and the beginning of development of Starship, Long March, and Yenisei rockets.

Flown vehicles

Retired
 Saturn V was a NASA launch vehicle that made 12 orbital launches between 1967 and 1973, principally for the Apollo program through 1972. When the third stage and Earth-orbit departure fuel was included, Saturn V placed approximately  into low Earth orbit. The final launch of Saturn V in 1973 placed Skylab, a  payload, into LEO.
Energia launched twice in 1987/88 before the program was cancelled by the Russian government, which succeeded the Soviet Union, but only the second flight payload reached orbit. On the first flight, launching the Polyus weapons platform (approximately ), the vehicle failed to enter orbit due to a software error on the kick-stage. The second flight successfully launched the Buran orbiter. The NASA Space Shuttle differed from traditional rockets in that the orbiter was essentially a reusable stage that carried cargo internally. Buran was intended to be reusable, similar to the Space Shuttle Orbiter, but not a rocket stage as it had no rocket engines (except for on-orbit maneuvering). It relied entirely on the disposable launcher Energia to reach orbit.

Operational 

 Falcon Heavy is rated to launch  to low Earth orbit (LEO) in a fully expendable configuration and an estimated  in a partially reusable configuration, in which only two of its three boosters are recovered. The latter configuration flew on 1 November 2022, but with a much smaller ~ payload being launched to geostationary orbit. The first test flight occurred on 6 February 2018, in a configuration in which recovery of all three boosters was attempted, with  Elon Musk's Tesla Roadster of  sent to an orbit beyond Mars.
The Space Launch System (SLS) is a US government super heavy-lift expendable launch vehicle, which was developed by NASA in a well-funded program for nearly a decade, and launched its first mission on 16 November of 2022. It is slated to be the primary launch vehicle for NASA's deep space exploration plans, including the planned crewed lunar flights of the Artemis program and a possible follow-on human mission to Mars in the 2030s.

Comparison

 Includes mass of Apollo command and service modules, Apollo Lunar Module, Spacecraft/LM Adapter, Saturn V Instrument Unit, S-IVB stage, and propellant for translunar injection; payload mass to LEO is about 
 Required upper stage or payload to perform final orbital insertion
 Side booster cores recoverable and centre core intentionally expended. First re-use of the side boosters was demonstrated in 2019 when the ones used on the Arabsat-6A launch were reused on the STP-2 launch.
 Includes mass of Orion spacecraft, European Service Module, Interim Cryogenic Propulsion Stage, and propellant for translunar injection
 Does not include dry mass of spaceship 
 Projected by SpaceX CEO Elon Musk 
Falcon Heavy has launched 5 times since 2018, but first three times did not qualify as a "super heavy" because recovery of the centre core was attempted.
Apollo 6 was a "partial failure": It reached orbit, but had problems with the second and third stages.

Proposed designs

Chinese proposals
Long March 5G was first proposed in 2018 as a concept for the Chinese Lunar Exploration Program. The length of the Long March-9 will exceed 114 meters, and the rocket would have a core stage with a diameter of 10 meters. Long March 9 is expected to carry a payload of 160 tonnes into low-Earth orbit, with a capacity of 53 tonnes for Earth-Moon transfer orbit. Development was approved in 2021.

Russian proposals
Yenisei, a super heavy-lift launch vehicle using existing components instead of pushing the less-powerful Angara A5V project, was proposed by Russia's RSC Energia in August 2016.

A revival of the Energia booster was also proposed in 2016, also to avoid pushing the Angara project. If developed, this vehicle could allow Russia to launch missions towards establishing a permanent Moon base with simpler logistics, launching just one or two 80-to-160-tonne super-heavy rockets instead of four 40-tonne Angara A5Vs implying quick-sequence launches and multiple in-orbit rendezvous. In February 2018, the КРК СТК (space rocket complex of the super-heavy class) design was updated to lift at least 90 tonnes to LEO and 20 tonnes to lunar polar orbit, and to be launched from Vostochny Cosmodrome. The first flight is scheduled for 2028, with Moon landings starting in 2030. It looks like this proposal has been at least paused.

US proposals
The SpaceX Starship system is a two-stage-to-orbit fully reusable launch vehicle being privately developed by SpaceX, consisting of the Super Heavy booster as the first stage and a second stage, also called Starship. It is designed to be a long-duration cargo and passenger-carrying spacecraft. Testing of the second stage (the Ship) is completed in the atmosphere, while testing of the first stage (the Booster) and the orbital capabilities of the ship is underway. An orbital test of the full rocket is planned for the second half of February or March 2023.

Blue Origin has plans for a project following their New Glenn rocket, termed New Armstrong, which some media sources have speculated will be a larger launch vehicle.

Cancelled designs

Numerous super-heavy-lift vehicles have been proposed and received various levels of development prior to their cancellation.

Four test vehicles were launched from 1969 to 1972, but all failed shortly after lift-off. The program was suspended in May 1974 and formally cancelled in March 1976. The Soviet UR-700 rocket design concept competed against the N1, but was never developed.

During project Aelita (1969-1972), the Soviets were developing a way to beat the Americans to Mars. They designed the UR-700m, a nuclear powered variant of the UR-700, to assemble the  MK-700 spacecraft in earth orbit in two launches. The only Universal Rocket to make it past the design phase was the UR-500 while the N1 was selected to be the Soviets' HLV for lunar and Martian missions.

It never left the drawing board.

The American Saturn MLV family of rockets was proposed in 1965 by NASA as successors to the Saturn V rocket. The Nova designs were also studied by NASA before the agency chose the Saturn V in the early 1960s.

Based on the recommendations of the Stafford Synthesis report, First Lunar Outpost (FLO) would have relied on a massive Saturn-derived launch vehicle known as the Comet HLLV. FLO was cancelled during the design process along with the rest of the Space Exploration Initiative.

The U.S. Ares V for the Constellation program was intended to reuse many elements of the Space Shuttle program, both on the ground and flight hardware, to save costs. The Ares V was designed to carry  and was cancelled in 2010.

The Shuttle-Derived Heavy Lift Launch Vehicle ("HLV") was an alternate super heavy-lift launch vehicle proposal for the NASA Constellation program, proposed in 2009.

Although preliminary engineering of the design was done by TRW, the project never moved forward due to the closing of NASA's Future Projects Branch.

The Rus-M was a proposed Russian family of launchers whose development began in 2009. It would have had two super heavy variants: one able to lift 50-60 tons, and another able to lift 130-150 tons.

SpaceX Interplanetary Transport System was a  diameter launch vehicle concept unveiled in 2016. In 2017 the 12 m evolved into a  diameter concept Big Falcon Rocket which was renamed as SpaceX Starship.

See also
 Comparison of orbital launch systems
 List of orbital launch systems
 Sounding rocket, suborbital launch vehicle
 Medium-lift launch vehicle, capable of lifting  of payload into low Earth orbit
 Heavy-lift launch vehicle, capable of lifting  of payload into low Earth orbit

Notes

References

Space launch vehicles